Jane Eyre is a 1996 romantic drama film adaptation of Charlotte Brontë's 1847 novel Jane Eyre. This Hollywood version, directed by Franco Zeffirelli, is similar to the original novel, although it compresses and eliminates most of the plot in the last quarter of the book (the running away, the trials and tribulations, new-found relations, and new job) to condense it into a 2-hour movie.

Plot
Jane Eyre (portrayed as the orphan child by Anna Paquin and as an adult by Charlotte Gainsbourg) is a plain, impoverished young woman hired by Mr. Rochester (William Hurt) through Mrs. Fairfax (Joan Plowright) to work as a governess for Adèle (Josephine Serre). Despite her mild unprepossessing nun-like manner, Jane has strong hidden passions and shows her strong character by expressing her opinions and showing resolve in times of trouble. Rochester is a Byronic anti-hero, tortured and tormented by family troubles, past injustices and secrets. Rochester and Jane develop a mutual affinity. They fall in love and the marriage date is set. What Jane does not realize is that she must share the estate and, ultimately, Mr. Rochester with his wife, Bertha (Maria Schneider), who is mentally ill and is confined in an upstairs attic with a nurse, Grace Poole (Billie Whitelaw).

The marriage is stopped by Bertha's brother Richard Mason (Edward de Souza) and lawyer Briggs (Peter Woodthorpe). Jane flees; her world in ruins. She recovers in the parsonage, her aunt's original home, and discovers she is now wealthy through inheriting her long-lost uncle's fortune in Madeira. She receives a proposal of marriage from Parson St. John Rivers but her heart and soul is with Rochester. Jane goes back to find Rochester's house, Thornfield Hall, burnt down and Rochester crippled and blinded by a fire set by Bertha, who perished. However, Jane's love for Rochester is undiminished; she nurses him back to health, he recovers his eyesight and they marry.

Cast

Production
The location for Thornfield Hall is Haddon Hall, Bakewell, Derbyshire, UK. Since Zeffirelli's use of Haddon Hall, subsequent versions of Jane Eyre have used it and it is now apparently synonymous with Thornfield Hall. Prior to Zeffirelli's location use, Haddon Hall had been once used (before Jane Eyre) as the castle for The Princess Bride.

Release
The film was released on VHS and DVD by Miramax on February 24, 2003. The film debuted on the Blu-ray format for the first time on September 11, 2012 in a double feature with Becoming Jane (2007), released by Echo Bridge Entertainment.

Reception
The film holds a positive rating of 75% at Rotten Tomatoes based on 28 reviews. The New York Times called Hurt "embarrassingly miscast as a Rochester more nearly a mild eccentric than a brooding, Byronic type", but conceded that the film "has its moments".

References

External links
 
 
 Review at JaneEyre.net

1996 films
British romantic drama films
1990s English-language films
English-language French films
English-language Italian films
French romantic drama films
Italian romantic drama films
Films based on Jane Eyre
Films directed by Franco Zeffirelli
Films about nannies
American romantic drama films
French films based on novels
1990s American films
1990s British films
1990s French films